Fox Sports  was an Italian pay television sports channel that was launched on August 9, 2013. A second channel, Fox Sports 2 was launched on December 20, 2013. The first channel closed in late August 2018, after the second closed in 2015.

Programming rights

American Football
 National Football League

Australian Rules Football
 Australian Football League

Football 
 Premier League
 FA Cup
 Community Shield
 Bundesliga
 DFL-Supercup
 Eredivisie
 Copa Libertadores
 Copa Sudamericana 
 Recopa Sudamericana
 La Liga 
 Ligue 1
 Africa Cup of Nations

Motorsports 
 World Rally Championship

Martial Arts 
 UFC

Volleyball 
 CEV Women's Champions League

Baseball 
 Major League Baseball

Hokey
 National Hockey League

Darts
 PDC World Darts Championship
 Premier League Darts

Programs broadcast by Fox Sports in Italy 
 Fox Sports Live
 Football Station
 Viva la Liga
 Bundes Platz 
 USA Sport Today

See also
 Fox Sports International
 Fox Sports Netherlands

References

External links
 Fox Sports official website

Italy
Italian-language television stations
Defunct television channels in Italy
Sports television in Italy
Television channels and stations established in 2013
Television channels and stations disestablished in 2018
2013 establishments in Italy
2018 disestablishments in Italy